The Andy Milonakis Show is an American sketch comedy television show starring Andy Milonakis, which aired on MTV2, the first season having aired on MTV. The program premiered on June 26, 2005 and ended with its three-season run when it was cancelled on May 1, 2007.

Format
The show features Milonakis and a supporting cast of his actual neighbors and people from the Lower East Side, Manhattan neighborhood. There is no plot, and the sketches tend to be absurdist and silly. The content is rated TV PG. There are often animated segments, and man-on-the-street segments. The final sketch usually involves a celebrity guest. In the third and final season, Milonakis moved to Los Angeles to be with his now famous pet turtle, Herbie. His best friend, Ralphie, sneaks along and moves with him and made their old friends into household items to bring along.

Episodes

Season 1

Season 2

Season 3

References

External links
 

2005 American television series debuts
2007 American television series endings
2000s American sketch comedy television series
American television series with live action and animation
English-language television shows
MTV original programming
MTV2 original programming